Jānis Vucāns (born 9 February 1956) is a Latvian politician and mathematician. He is the member of the Latvijai un Ventspilij Party and a deputy of the 11th, 12th and 13th Saeima, representing the Union of Greens and Farmers. He began his current term in parliament on 17 October 2011. He has graduated from University of Latvia.

Dr. Vucāns served as President of the Baltic Sea Parliamentary Conference from 2015 through 2016.

References

1956 births
Living people
Scientists from Riga
For Latvia and Ventspils politicians
Deputies of the 10th Saeima
Deputies of the 11th Saeima
Deputies of the 12th Saeima
Deputies of the 13th Saeima
21st-century Latvian mathematicians
Riga State Gymnasium No.1 alumni
University of Latvia alumni
Recipients of the Order of the Cross of Terra Mariana, 3rd Class
Politicians from Riga
20th-century Latvian mathematicians